Cheiracanthium incertum is a species of spider of the family Cheiracanthiidae. It is endemic to Sri Lanka.

See also 
 List of Cheiracanthiidae species

References

incertum
Spiders of the Indian subcontinent
Arthropods of Sri Lanka
Endemic fauna of Sri Lanka
Spiders described in 1869
Taxa named by Octavius Pickard-Cambridge